Nikos Tsiforos (27 August 1912 – 6 August 1970) was a Greek humorist, screenwriter, and film director. He  had more than 60 film scripts to his credit between 1948 and 1970. He further directed 17 films between 1948 and 1961.

Biography
He was born in Alexandria, Egypt, in 1912;  two years later, his family was permanently resettled in Athens.  From age eleven to his death, Nikos Tsiforos had been writing  with gusto. In 1938, he wrote his first play,  performed in an outdoors  theatre in Freattyda; although his first effort did not quite succeed,  young Nikos was not disappointed.  He went on to earn a degree in Law, and  work, for two years, at the Election Supervision Council. He soon resigned to  travel the seas.

He continued switching  jobs  regularly until 1939, all the while writing film scripts as well as  doing other types of writing.  His first big break came  in 1944 when the company of Dimitris Horn and Mairi Aroni staged a play of his  at the  Akropol theatre. The play was "Η Πινακοθήκη των Ηλιθίων" (The portrait gallery of dolts).   In 1948-1949, he scripted and directed his 
first film Τελευταία αποστολή  (Last Mission).

He  went on to work as a reporter  for the  Athens press: newspapers   (Φιλελεύθερος; Βήμα; Ελεύθερος Κόσμος), and magazines   (Τραστ, Ρομάντσο, Ταχυδρόμος, Πάνθεον), all the while  writing over 40 theatrical plays and over 80 film scripts.
 
He  collaborated extensively with  Polyvios Vassiliadis  on numerous hit film scripts, earning exceptional renown for their scintillating wit and hilarious humor.

His deft use of the Greek contemporary vernacular is considered peerless by several leading literary critics.

Works

 Άνθρωποι και ανθρωπάκια (People and nobodies)
Η Αθήνα σήμερα - Κρουαζιέρες μέσα στην ιστορία (Athens Today, Cruises in  History) 
Όμορφη Θεσσαλονίκη (Beautiful Thessaloniki)   
 Τα παιδιά της πιάτσας  (The boys of the Hood)  Excerpts youtube story
 Διηγήματα (Short stories)
 Εορταστικά (Holiday essays) 
Ο πρώτος Τσιφόρος   (Early Tsiforos)
 Μίλων Φιρίκης 
 Ελληνική κρουαζιέρα (A Greek Cruise) 
Ελληνική μυθολογία (Greek mythology)   Excerpt   Excerpt excerpt Excerpt
 Ο Γκιούλιβερ στη χώρα των Γιγάντων - Ο Γκιούλιβερ στη χώρα των νάνων (Gulliver in the Land of the Giants; in the land of the Dwarfs)
'(Η Ιστορία της Αθήνας  (The History of Athens) 
 (History of England) Ιστορία της Αγγλίας  
( History of France) Ιστορία της Γαλλίας  
(History of the United States) Ιστορία των Ηνωμένων Πολιτειών  
 Χρονογραφήματα (Newspaper columns)
Τζιμ κακής ποιότητος (Low quality Jim)  
Οι κονκισταδόροι (The conquistadors)
 Το τυχερό μου αστέρι (My Lucky Star)
 Τα παλιόπαιδα τ' ατίθασα (The frisky hoodlums)
 Εμείς και οι Φράγκοι ( We and the Franks) online 
Παραμύθια πίσω από τα κάγκελα (Tales  from behind bars)
 Ο κόσμος κι ο κοσμάκης  (The World and the Little People)
 Η πινακοθήκη των ηλιθίων (The Portrait Gallery of Dolts)
 Τα ρεμάλια ήρωες  (Heroic Heels) 
Στηβ το χαρούμενο κάθαρμα  (Steve, the cheerful scumbag)
Οι μυστικές εταιρίες  ( Secret Companies) 
 Βιβλικά χαμόγελα (Biblical smiles)
Η γυναίκα κουρσάρος (The Woman Pirate)

Selected filmography

Bibliography
 Sylvia Mittler, "The Crusades and Frankish Medieval Greece as (Re)Appropriation: Carnivalesque Historiography and Modern Greek Humorist Nikos Tsiforos." In: Postmodern Medievalisms, ed. Richard Utz and Jesse G. Swan (Cambridge: Brewer, 2004), pp. 209–36.
 Sylvia Mittler, "Subversive Storytelling: Popular Historiography, Alternative Cultural Memory, and Modern Greek Humorist Nikos Tsiforos." In: Oral and Written Narratives and Cultural Identity, ed. Francisco Cota Fagundes and Irene Maria F. Blayer (New York: Peter Lang, 2007), pp. 171–88.

External links

1912 births
1970 deaths
Greek screenwriters
20th-century Greek dramatists and playwrights
Greek journalists
Greek film directors
People from Alexandria
Egyptian people of Greek descent
20th-century screenwriters
20th-century journalists
Egyptian emigrants to Greece
Film people from Athens